Maksi Junction railway station is a railway station in Shajapur district of Madhya Pradesh. Its code is MKC. It serves Maksi city. The station consists of three platforms. It lacks many facilities including water and sanitation. Passenger, Express and Superfast trains halt here.

References

Railway junction stations in Madhya Pradesh
Railway stations in Shajapur district
Ratlam railway division